Flowers Forever is the side project of Tilly and the Wall guitarist Derek Pressnall.  The band has released a full-length album of the same name on Team Love Records in 2008.

Background 
From the video biography,

Flowers Forever is a
project that surfaced a
few months back in a
string of strange events
that occurred in my life.
It's an outlet of
performance, music,
painting, video, and
spirituality.

It's about self-expression
and freeing yourself
from the start/stop,
beginning/end, A/B,
morning/night of
everything.
It's about trying to
comprehend the idea of
just being, always have
been, and always will be.

Tap into the current and
let it rush over you.

Bone, teeth, dirt

CD/LP Flowers Forever

Personnel
 Derek Pressnall – rhythm guitar, singing, percussion, bells
 Chris Senseney – guitar, bass, trumpet, piano, organ, mellotron, harmony singing
 Craig Dee – drums, percussion, shouting, bells

Additionally,

 Shane Aspegren – steel drum
 Pearl Boyd – singing
 David Downing – cello
 Tyler Hottovy – trombone
 Ben Kristy – tuba
 Dan McCarthy – accordion
 CJ Olson – shouting
 Ian Simons – saxophone
 Julia Bryson – tropical vocals
 Stephanie Drootin – tropical vocals
 Neely Jenkins' – tropical vocals
 other friends – group singing

Recorded by Ian Eiillo at ARC Studio August 2007

Mixed by AJ Mogis at ARC Studio October 2007

Mastering at Focus Mastering by Doug Van Sloun

Released February 19, 2008

Track listing 

Total time 40:12 (13 tracks)

 Beautiful Tornado – 1:15
 American Dream – 4:20
 Black Rosary – 3:06
 Wet Diamonds – 2:10
 Golden Shackles – 3:50
 Dirty Dollar Bill – 3:49
 Jealous Motherfucker – 3:06
 Happy New Year – 2:00
 Strange Fruit – 3:49
 Smash the Cool – 3:29
 Beach Bum – 2:43
 Elliptical Love – 3:13
 Black Pope – 3:29

Remixes by Flowers Forever 
 Nursery, Academy on Elephant Shell (2008)

References

External links 
 Flowers Forever at Team Love
 Flowers Forever MySpace
 Video Biography on YouTube

Indie rock musical groups from Nebraska
Team Love Records artists